Pensarn is a suburb of Abergele in Conwy County Borough, Wales, the name Pensarn means 'end of the causeway' in English. The crossing of Morfa Rhuddlan was facilitated by a causeway near the sea, located at this point. This causeway was later developed by holiday developments along the coast between Rhyl and Abergele.

Pensarn is served by Abergele and Pensarn railway station, the A55 and National Cycle Route 5

External links

BBC Wales website

Abergele
Villages in Conwy County Borough